A list song, also called a laundry list song or a catalog song, is a song based wholly or in part on a list. Unlike topical songs with a narrative and a cast of characters, list songs typically develop by working through a series of information, often humorous or comically, articulating their images additively, and sometimes use items of escalating absurdity.

The form as a defining feature of an oral tradition dates back to early classical antiquity, where it played an important part of early hexameter poetry for oral bards like Homer and Hesiod.

In classical opera the list song has its own genre, the catalogue aria, that was especially popular in Italian opera buffa and comic opera in the latter half of the eighteenth and early nineteenth centuries. Leporello's aria , also nicknamed The Catalogue Aria, is a prominent example, and often mentioned as a direct antecedent to the 20th-century musical's list song.

The list song is a frequent element of 20th-century popular music and became a Broadway staple. Cole Porter, Irving Berlin, Noël Coward, and Stephen Sondheim are composers and lyricists who have used the form. The very first commercial recording of a Cole Porter tune was his list song "I've a Shooting Box in Scotland" originally from See America First (1913). Berlin followed soon after with the list song "When I Discovered You" from his first complete Broadway score Watch Your Step (1914).

Porter would frequently return to the list song form, notable examples include "You're the Top" from the 1934 musical Anything Goes, "Friendship", one of Porter's wittiest list songs, from DuBarry Was a Lady, and "Farming" and "Let's Not Talk About Love" both from Let's Face It! (1942), and both written for Danny Kaye to showcase his ability with tongue-twisting lyrics. In "You're the Top" Porter pays tribute to his colleague Irving Berlin by including the item "You're the top! You're a Berlin ballad."

Irving Berlin would likewise often write songs in the genre, notable examples include "My Beautiful Rhinestone Girl" from Face the Music (1932), a list song that starts off with a sequence of  similes, "Outside of That I Love You" from Louisiana Purchase, and "Anything You Can Do (I Can Do Better)" a challenge-duet, and Berlin's starkest antithesis-driven list song, "You Can't Get a Man with a Gun", and "Doin' What Comes Natur'lly", all three from the 1946 musical Annie Get Your Gun.

Examples of list songs, and their composers/performers, include the following. Songs are in alphabetical order by title (omitting the definite article where not important to the title).

A 
 "'A' You're Adorable" (Sid Lippman, Buddy Kaye and Fred Wise)
 "A Boy Without a Girl" (1960) by Anthony Newley
 "A Hard Rain's a-Gonna Fall" (Bob Dylan)
 "A Little Priest" by Stephen Sondheim and Hugh Wheeler from Sweeney Todd: The Demon Barber of Fleet Street
 "A Little Something Refreshing" (Eric Stefani), performed by No Doubt
 "A13 Trunk Road to the Sea" by Billy Bragg, first released in 1991 on The Peel Sessions Album; based on "(Get Your Kicks on) Route 66" by Bobby Troup
 "Ah, Paris!" by Stephen Sondheim, a geographical list song for the 1971 musical Follies
 "All I Really Want to Do" a song written by Bob Dylan and featured on his Tom Wilson-produced 1964 album, Another Side of Bob Dylan
 "Area Codes" (Ludacris)
 "Around the World" (Red Hot Chili Peppers)
 "Art Eats Art" (Orchestral Manoeuvres in the Dark) lists many historical arts figures
 "A Well-Dressed Hobbit" (Rie Sheridan Rose, Marc Gunn)
 "Ain't Got No" (from the musical Hair)
 "All My Ex's Live in Texas" (George Strait and Whitey Shafer)
 "American Bad-ass" (Kid Rock)
 "All the Words in the English Language" from Animaniacs
 "Anything You Can Do (I Can Do Better)"
 "As Some Day It May Happen" (from The Mikado by Gilbert & Sullivan)
 "At Long Last Love" by Cole Porter, for his 1938 musical You Never Know
 "At the Hop" (Danny and the Juniors) lists many popular dances of the late 1950s.

B 
 "The Bad Touch" (Bloodhound Gang) lists many euphemisms for sexual acts.
 "The Bare Necessities" from the animated 1967 Disney film The Jungle Book.
 "Bahay Kubo" (traditional) lists vegetables found in the surrounding of a farm.
 "Before He Cheats"
 "The Begat" (Burton Lane and E.Y. Harburg)
 "Better Than Anything" (David "Buck" Wheat & Bill Loughborough) lists all the things love is better than.
 The Big Bamboo (traditional Caribbean)
 "Black Boys" from the musical Hair
 "Blue" from the 2014 musical Heathers: The Musical with music, lyrics, and a book by Laurence O'Keefe and Kevin Murphy
 "BOB, a song on Poodle Hat" ("Weird Al" Yankovic) lists palindromes, in a parody of Subterranean Homesick Blues by Bob Dylan.
 "The Booklovers" (The Divine Comedy)
 "Brothers and Sisters" (Blur)
 "Brush Up Your Shakespeare" (Cole Porter) from Kiss Me, Kate

C 
 "California Girls" (The Beach Boys)
 "Can U Dig It" (Pop Will Eat Itself)
 "Carol Brown" (Flight of the Conchords)
 "Cherry Pies Ought to Be You" with music and lyrics by Cole Porter for his 1950 musical Out of This World
 "Chop Suey," music by Richard Rodgers, words by Oscar Hammerstein II, introduced by Juanita Hall and Patrick Adiarte in Flower Drum Song
 "Coded Language" (Krust / Saul Williams)
 "Come Back To Me" with lyrics by Alan Jay Lerner for Burton Lane's On a Clear Day You Can See Forever
 "Come Together" (The Beatles)
 "Come To the Supermarket In Old Peking" (Cole Porter)
 "Comedy Tonight" from A Funny Thing Happened on the Way to the Forum by Stephen Sondheim
 "Conga!", music by Leonard Bernstein, words by Betty Comden and Adolph Green, introduced by Rosalind Russell in Wonderful Town
 "Could I Leave You?" by Stephen Sondheim for the 1971 musical Follies
 "Count It Up" from Field Music's 2018 album Open Here
 "Cuntry Boner" (Puscifer)

D 
 "Datura" (Tori Amos)
 "Destroy Rock & Roll" (Mylo)
 "Disappointing" (John Grant)
 "DJ Bombay" (Michael V.) list down things that are sold by Indian nationals in the Philippines.
 "Do I Love You?" (Cole Porter) from DuBarry Was a Lady
 "Done Too Soon" (Neil Diamond)
 "Don't Let's Be Beastly to the Germans" by Noël Coward
 "Don't Put Your Daughter on the Stage, Mrs Worthington" by Noël Coward
 "Do You Remember These" (The Statler Brothers)
 "DuBarry Was a Lady" (Cole Porter) from DuBarry Was a Lady

E 
 "Eclipse" (Pink Floyd)
 "Eight Easy Steps" (Alanis Morissette)
 "88 Lines About 44 Women" (The Nails)
 "The Elements" (Tom Lehrer)
 "Elephant Talk" (King Crimson)
 "Endless Art" (A House)
 "Every Tube Station Song" (Jay Foreman)
 "Everybody Knows" (1988) by Leonard Cohen
"Everybody Loves Raymond" (Lemon Demon)
 "Everything Is Alright" (Motion City Soundtrack)

F 
 "Farming" by Cole Porter from Let's Face It! (1942)
 "F.E.A.R." (Ian Brown)
 "Female" from Keith Urban's 2018 album Graffiti U
 "50 Things You Should Think About to Stop You Doing Your Beans" (Kunt and the Gang)
 "50 Ways to Leave Your Lover" (Paul Simon)
 "50 Ways to Say Goodbye" (Train)
 "52 Girls" (B-52s)
 "Forever Young" (Bob Dylan)
 "Foxtrot Uniform Charlie Kilo" (The Bloodhound Gang)
 "Friendship" (Cole Porter) from DuBarry Was a Lady

G 
 "Gee, Officer Krupke" by Stephen Sondheim (lyrics) and Leonard Bernstein (music) from West Side Story
 "Get Me Bodied" (Beyoncé)
 "Girl of 100 Lists" (Go-Go's)
 "Gin Soaked Boy" (The Divine Comedy)
 "God" (John Lennon)
 "God Bless" (Combichrist) lists infamous murderers and cult leaders
 "Going Nowhere Slow" (The Bloodhound Gang) lists cities across the USA
 "Good Doctor" (Robbie Williams)
 "The Green Grass Grows All Around" (Traditional)
 "Green Grow the Rushes, O" (Traditional)

H 
 "Hair" (from the musical Hair)
 "Hank Williams Said it Best" (Guy Clark)
 "Hardware Store" ("Weird Al" Yankovic)
 "Hashish" (from the musical Hair)
 "Hello" (The Beloved)
 "High Tech Redneck" (George Jones)
 "Hot Topic" (Le Tigre)
 "How About You?" (Burton Lane/Ralph Freed)
 "Hypersonic Missiles" - Sam Fender

I 
 "I Dreamed Of A Hillbilly Heaven" (Tex Ritter)
 "I Can't Get Started (With You)" (Ira Gershwin and Vernon Duke)
 "I Get a Kick Out of You" by Cole Porter, first sung in the 1934 musical Anything Goes
 "I Got Life" (from the musical Hair)
 "If I Were a Boy (Beyoncé) 
 "I'm Black/Ain't Got No" from the musical Hair
"I'm Proud of the BBC" (Mitch Benn)
 "I'm Still Here" (Stephen Sondheim)
 "I'm Trying" from Adam Gwon's 2008 musical Ordinary Days
 "I Started a Blog Nobody Read" (Sprites)
 "I've Been Everywhere" (Lucky Starr (original), Geoff Mack (U.S.A. adaptation))
 "Imperfect List" (Big Hard Excellent Fish)
 "Ironic" (Bo Burnham)
 "It Ain't Necessarily So" with lyrics by Ira Gershwin from George Gershwin's opera Porgy and Bess
 "It's an Elk" from the 2013 musical Bubble Boy with music and lyrics by Cinco Paul
 "It's Grim Up North" (The Justified Ancients of Mu Mu)
 "Isang Linggong Pag-Ibig" (Imelda Papin)
 "It's the End of the World as We Know It (And I Feel Fine)" (R.E.M.)
 "I've a Shooting Box in Scotland" (Cole Porter) from See America First
 "I've Been Everywhere" (Geoff Mack)
 "I Like It" (Cardi B)

J – L 
 "Jung Talent Time" (TISM)
 "Kidney Bingos" (Wire)
 "La Vie Bohème" (Jonathan Larson)
 "The Lady Is a Tramp" from the 1937 Rodgers and Hart musical Babes in Arms
 "Let 'em In" (Wings)
 "Let's Call the Whole Thing Off" (George Gershwin and Ira Gershwin)
 "Let's Do It, Let's Fall in Love" (Cole Porter)
 "Let's Not Talk About Love" by Cole Porter from Let's Face It! (1942)
 "Liaisons" by Stephen Sondheim from A Little Night Music
 "Life Is a Rock (But the Radio Rolled Me)" (Reunion)
 "Lime Jello Marshmallow Cottage Cheese Surprise" (William Bolcom, performed by Joan Morris)
 "List of Films" (Nick Helm)
 "Losing My Edge" (LCD Soundsystem)
 "Lost Property" (The Divine Comedy)
 "Love Is..." (Bo Burnham)
 "Love Your Love the Most" Eric Church Lists everything he loves
 "Lower 48" The Gourds
 "Lydia the Tattooed Lady" by Groucho Marx from At The Circus

M 
 "Mad Dogs and Englishmen" (Noël Coward)
 "Madamina, il catalogo è questo" (Mozart) ("The Catalogue Aria" from Don Giovanni)
 "Mambo No. 5" (performed by Lou Bega and Perez Prado)
 "Man on the Moon" (R.E.M.)
 "Manhattan" (Richard Rodgers, Lorenz Hart)
 "Marz" (John Grant)
 "Matangi" (M.I.A.)
 "MfG" (Die Fantastischen Vier)
 "Miracles" (Insane Clown Posse)
 "Miss Sarajevo" (U2)
 "Mr. Goldstone" (music, Jule Styne; lyrics, Stephen Sondheim)
 "Moments to Remember" (Robert Allen and Al Stillman)
 "Mope" (The Bloodhound Gang)
 "My Favorite Things" (Rodgers and Hammerstein)
 "My Kind of Town (Chicago Is)" (Jimmy Van Heusen and Sammy Cahn) Big hit for Frank Sinatra extolling the virtues of Chicago.
 "My Funny Valentine" (Richard Rodgers)
 "My Ship" (music by Kurt Weill and lyrics by Ira Gershwin)

N 
 "Name Game" (Shirley Ellis)
 "Napoleon" with lyrics by Yip Harburg and music by Harold Arlen from Jamaica
 "Never Gonna Give You Up" (Rick Astley)
 "New Direction" (Sugar Ray) (lists things you can do to make yourself a better person)
 "New Math" (Bo Burnham)
 "New Rules" (Dua Lipa)
 "No Hay Nadie Como Tú" (Calle 13)
 "Not" (Big Thief)
 "Numb" (U2)
 "Nunal" (Vincent Daffalong)

O – Q 
 "One By the Venom" (Finn Andrews)
 "One Hundred Easy Ways (To Lose a Man)" from Leonard Bernstein's 1953 musical Wonderful Town
 "One Bourbon, One Scotch, One Beer" (Rudy Toombs)
 "One More Minute" ("Weird Al" Yankovic)
 "One Week" (Barenaked Ladies)
 "Overdrive" (Eraserheads) mentions places in the Philippines.
 "Paren de Venir" (The Sacados)
 "Pencil Full of Lead" (Paolo Nutini)
 "Penny Lane"
 "People Who Died" (Jim Carroll)
 "Pennsylvania" (The Bloodhound Gang)
 "Pepper" (Butthole Surfers)
 "The Physician" with music and lyrics by Cole Porter for his 1933 musical Nymph Errant
 "Plane Too" (Loudon Wainwright III)
 "Play with Me" (Extreme (band))
 "Pokerap" (Pokémon)
 "Polkamon" ("Weird Al" Yankovic)
 "Poor Young Millionaire" (Cole Porter)
 "Porn Star Dancing" (My Darkest Days featuring Zakk Wylde and Chad Kroeger)
 "Portobello Road" (from Walt Disney film Bedknobs and Broomsticks)
 "Poster Child" (Red Hot Chili Peppers)
 "The Pride" (Five Finger Death Punch)
 "Questions and Answers (The Three B's)" from the musical On Your Toes (Rodgers and Hart)

R 
 Reunion Life is a Rock
"Raise Up" (Petey Pablo)
 "Ramblin' Man" (Lemon Jelly)
 "The Rattlin' Bog" (Traditional)
 "Reasons to be Cheerful, Part 3" (Ian Dury & the Blockheads)
 “Red" (Taylor Swift)
 "The Referee's Alphabet" (Half Man Half Biscuit)
 "Rickets" (Deftones)
 "Rhode Island Is Famous For You" with lyrics by Howard Dietz and music by Arthur Schwartz from Inside U.S.A.
 "Rock & Roll Heaven" (The Righteous Brothers)
 "Rock Lobster" (The B-52's)
 "(Get Your Kicks on) Route 66" (Bobby Troup)
 "Royals" Lorde lists subjects of modern pop songs

S 
 "Sad" (Bo Burnham)
 "The Saga of Jenny" with music by Kurt Weill and lyrics by Ira Gershwin written for the 1941 Broadway musical Lady in the Dark
 "Said the Hobbit to the Horse" (Marc Gunn)
 "The Sample Song" (Dorothy Shay)
 "Short Memory" (Midnight Oil)
 "Show Me What You Got" (Limp Bizkit)
 "Seven Curses" (Bob Dylan)
 "7 Things" (Miley Cyrus)
 "Sinaktan mo ang puso ko" (Michael V.) lists down the hurtful things that his lover did
 "Sixteen Reasons"(Bill and Doree Post) (#3 hit for Connie Stevens in 1960)
 "Slow Train" (Flanders and Swann)
 "Sodomy" (from the musical Hair)
 "Soldier's Things" (Tom Waits)
 "Song for Whoever" (The Beautiful South)
"Starfish and Coffee", (Prince)
 "Stars on 45" (Stars on 45)
 "Start Button" (Private Thoughts in Public Places featuring Streamer, on As Heard On Radio Soulwax Pt. 2)
 "The Stately Homes of England" by Noël Coward from his 1938 musical Operette
 "Subterranean Homesick Blues" (Bob Dylan)
 "Super Supper March" (Nigel Pilkington)

T 
 "Tschaikowsky (and Other Russians)" with lyrics by Ira Gershwin and music by Kurt Weill lists the names of fifty-three composers of Tsarist and Soviet Russia
 The chorus of "Tam Pierce" (Widdecombe Fair) lists all the people accompanying the narrator to the fair.
 "Teachers" (Daft Punk)
 "Technologic" (Daft Punk)
 "Telefonbuchpolka" (Georg Kreisler)
 "Ten Commandments of Love" (The Moonglows)
 "Ten Crack Commandments" (The Notorious B.I.G.)
 "That Is the End of the News" by Noël Coward from his 1945 musical revue Sigh No More
 "That Funny Feeling" (Bo Burnham)
 "That's a Rectangle" (Storybots)
 "That's Country Bro" (Toby Keith)
 "There Ain't No Easy Run" (Dave Dudley)
 "There Is Nothing Like a Dame" (Richard Rodgers with lyrics by Oscar Hammerstein II)
 "These Foolish Things" (Eric Maschwitz and Jack Strachey)
 "They All Fall In Love" (Cole Porter)
 "They All Laughed"  (George Gershwin and Ira Gershwin)
 "Things In My Jeep" (The Lonely Island and Linkin Park)
 "Things to Do (I've Tried)" (David Byrne)
 "The Things You Left Behind" by The Nails (1986)
 "Third Uncle" (Brian Eno, Brian Turrington)
 "Thou Shalt Always Kill" (Dan le sac Vs Scroobius Pip)
 "Thou Shalt Not" with lyrics by Don Black and music by Jule Styne from Bar Mitzvah Boy
 "Till the End of Time (song)" (Buddy Kaye and Ted Mossman)
 "To Keep My Love Alive" composed by Richard Rodgers with lyrics by Lorenz Hart for the musical A Connecticut Yankee
 "To Kokoraki" (the Cockerel) (Flanders and Swann)
 "Transmetropolitan" (The Pogues)
 "Turn a Blind Eye" (Half Man Half Biscuit)
 "Turn! Turn! Turn!" (Pete Seeger, after King Solomon) (Ecclesiastes)
 "The Twelve Days of Christmas" (Traditional)
 "21 Things I Want in a Lover" (Alanis Morissette)
 "The Unthinkable" (Boom Bip)

U – W 
 "Van Lingle Mungo" (Dave Frishberg)
 "Vinyl Records" (Todd Snider)
 "Vogue" (Madonna)
 "Vuelve" (Shakira)
 "Wakko's America" from Animaniacs
 "Walk Away", Franz Ferdinand
 "Waters of March" (Antonio Carlos Jobim)
 "Welcome to the Internet" (Bo Burnham)
 "We Care a Lot" (Faith No More)
 "We Didn't Start the Fire" (Billy Joel)
 "We're All Gonna Die!!!" (Baby FuzZ)
 "What a Wonderful World" (Thiele and Weiss)
 "When I Had a Uniform On" (Cole Porter)
 "White Woman's Instagram" (Bo Burnham)
 "Who's Gonna Fill Their Shoes" (George Jones)
 "Who's Next" (Tom Lehrer) lists countries acquiring nuclear weapons.
 "The Whole World Lost its Head" (Go-Go's)
 "White Boys" (from the musical Hair)
 "Why Do the Wrong People Travel" by Noël Coward from the 1961 musical Sail Away
 "The Windmills of Your Mind" (Michel Legrand, Eddy Marnay, Alan and Marilyn Bergman)
 "Wish (Komm Zu Mir)", From the film Run Lola Run (Thomas D)
 "Wishlist", Pearl Jam
 "Wonderful World", (Sam Cooke)

X – Z 
 "Yakko's World" from Animaniacs
 "You Can't Get a Man with a Gun" from Annie Get Your Gun
 "You're Moving Out Today" (Carole Bayer Sager)
 "You're the Top" (Cole Porter)
 "You've Seen Harlem at Its Best" by Ethel Waters
 "Zip" (Rodgers and Hart)

Patter songs 
Many patter songs fall into this genre such as:
 KoKo's List Song from The Mikado (see "As Some Day It May Happen" above)
 "Tschaikowsky (and Other Russians)" (Kurt Weill and Ira Gershwin) (see "Tschaikowsky" above)
 "The Major-General's Song" (Gilbert and Sullivan)

References 

 
Lists of songs
Song forms